Bryce Heem (born 18 January 1989) is a New Zealand rugby union player who currently plays as a wing or centre for the  in Super Rugby.

Club career
Heem began his senior rugby career with his home province  and made 3 appearances during the 2010 ITM Cup season before heading north to Whangārei to link up with  Taniwha as a loan player.   He spent 2 seasons with the Cambridge Blues and scored 5 tries in 15 appearances before heading down to the South Island to join the  Mako in 2012.   He firmly established himself as a regular starter for the men from Nelson during their impressive 2013 and 2014 ITM Cup campaigns and this form saw him handed a Super Rugby contract with the  ahead of the 2015 Super Rugby season.

On 8 April 2015, it was announced Heem would move to England to join Worcester Warriors in the Aviva Premiership from the 2015–16 season. Heem marked his debut with a try in a victory over Newcastle Falcons in November 2015.

On the 18 November 2017, Heem scored a hat-trick of tries in Worcester's first win of the 2017-18 English Premiership season. The win against Northampton Saints (30-15) saw Worcester lifted from bottom of the table. A culmination of improved performances in two close losses against Harlequins, in the preceding weeks.

Heem went on to play four seasons for Worcester Warriors, scoring 32 tries in 70 games.

On 27 February 2019, French giants Toulon announced that they had signed Heem on a two-year deal, starting from the 2019–20 Top 14 season. However, on 25 January 2021, the club granted him an early release from his contract to return to New Zealand for family reasons. He played 26 games and scored 6 tries for Toulon.

International career
Heem represented the All Blacks Sevens side from 2011 until he signed his Super Rugby contract with the Chiefs.   His time on the sevens circuit saw him win a silver medal at the 2014 Commonwealth Games in Glasgow.

References

External links 
 

1989 births
Living people
New Zealand rugby union players
Rugby union wings
Rugby union centres
Auckland rugby union players
Northland rugby union players
Tasman rugby union players
Chiefs (rugby union) players
Worcester Warriors players
RC Toulonnais players
Blues (Super Rugby) players
Rugby union players from Auckland
New Zealand international rugby sevens players
New Zealand expatriate rugby union players
New Zealand expatriate sportspeople in England
Expatriate rugby union players in England
Commonwealth Games rugby sevens players of New Zealand
Rugby sevens players at the 2014 Commonwealth Games
Commonwealth Games medallists in rugby sevens
Commonwealth Games silver medallists for New Zealand
Medallists at the 2014 Commonwealth Games